Plaine may refer to:
 Plaine (river), a tributary of the river Meurthe in France
 Plaine, Bas-Rhin, a commune in Alsace in north-eastern France
 Plaine-Haute, a commune in the Côtes-d'Armor department in Brittany in northwestern France
 Plaine Morte Glacier, a glacier in the canton of Bern in Switzerland
 Belle Plaine (disambiguation)
 La Plaine (disambiguation)

See also 
 Plain (disambiguation)